"Il mio amico" is a song by Italian rapper and singer Madame, with featured vocals by Fabri Fibra. It was released on 15 January 2021 by Sugar Music and was included in her first album Madame.

Track listing

Charts

Certifications

References

2021 songs
2021 singles
Madame (singer) songs
Fabri Fibra songs
Songs written by Dario Faini
Sugar Music singles